Convoy PQ 8 (8–17 January 1942) was an Arctic convoy of the Western Allies to aid the Soviet Union during the Second World War. The convoy left Iceland on 8 January 1942 and arrived in Murmansk nine days later. Having ignored earlier convoys, the Germans had begun to reinforce their forces in Norway and assembled the first U-boat wolfpack in the Arctic against PQ 8. On 17 January, Wolfpack Ulan damaged the merchant ship SS Harmatris, which was stranded in Russia until Convoy QP 14 (13–26 September 1942) and sank the destroyer  with the loss of all but two of the crew.

Background

Lend-lease

After Operation Barbarossa, the German invasion of the USSR, began on 22 June 1941, the UK and USSR signed an agreement in July that they would "render each other assistance and support of all kinds in the present war against Hitlerite Germany". Before September 1941 the British had dispatched 450 aircraft,  of rubber, 3,000,000 pairs of boots and stocks of tin, aluminium, jute, lead and wool. In September British and US representatives travelled to Moscow to study Soviet requirements and their ability to meet them. The representatives of the three countries drew up a protocol in October 1941 to last until June 1942 and to agree new protocols to operate from 1 July to 30 June of each following year until the end of Lend-Lease. The protocol listed supplies, monthly rates of delivery and totals for the period.

The first protocol specified the supplies to be sent but not the ships to move them. The USSR turned out to lack the ships and escorts and the British and Americans, who had made a commitment to "help with the delivery", undertook to deliver the supplies for want of an alternative. The main Soviet need in 1941 was military equipment to replace losses because, at the time of the negotiations, two large aircraft factories were being moved east from Leningrad and two more from Ukraine. It would take at least eight months to resume production, until when, aircraft output would fall from 80 to 30 aircraft per day. Britain and the US undertook to send 400 aircraft a month, at a ratio of three bombers to one fighter (later reversed), 500 tanks a month and 300 Bren gun carriers. The Anglo-Americans also undertook to send  of aluminium and 3, 862 machine tools, along with sundry raw materials, food and medical supplies.

British grand strategy

The growing German air strength in Norway and increasing losses to convoys and their escorts, led Rear-Admiral Stuart Bonham Carter, commander of the 18th Cruiser Squadron, Admiral sir John Tovey, Commander in Chief Home Fleet and  Admiral Sir Dudley Pound the First Sea Lord, the professional head of the Royal Navy, unanimously to advocate the suspension of Arctic convoys during the summer months. The small number of Russian ships available to meet Arctic convoys, losses inflicted by  based in Norway and the presence of the German battleship  in Norway from early 1942, had led to ships full of supplies to Russia becoming stranded at Iceland and empty and damaged ships waiting at Murmansk.

Signals intelligence

The British Government Code and Cypher School (GC&CS) based at Bletchley Park housed a small industry of code-breakers and traffic analysts that intercepted and decoded German naval transmissions. By June 1941, the German Enigma machine Home Waters settings used by surface ships and U-boats could quickly be read. On 1 February 1942, the Enigma machines used in U-boats in the Atlantic and Mediterranean were changed but German ships and the U-boats in Arctic waters continued with the older  ( from 1942, code-named Dolphin by the British). By mid-1941, British Y-stations were able to read  wireless telegraphy (W/T) transmissions and give advance warning of Luftwaffe operations. In 1941, interception parties (code-named Headaches) embarked on warships.

Arctic Ocean

Between Greenland and Norway are some of the most stormy waters of the world's oceans,  of water under gales full of snow, sleet and hail. The cold Arctic water was met by the Gulf Stream, warm water from the Gulf of Mexico, which became the North Atlantic Drift. Arriving at the south-west of England the drift moves between Scotland and Iceland; north of Norway the drift splits. One stream bears north of Bear Island to Svalbard and a southern stream follows the coast of Murmansk into the Barents Sea. The mingling of cold Arctic water and warmer water of higher salinity generates thick banks of fog for convoys to hide in but the waters drastically reduced the effectiveness of ASDIC as U-boats moved in waters of differing temperatures and density.

The area is in perpetual darkness in winter and permanent daylight in the summer and can make air reconnaissance almost impossible. Around the North Cape and in the Barents Sea the sea temperature rarely rises about 4° Celsius and a man in the water will die unless rescued immediately. The cold water and air makes spray freeze on the superstructure of ships, which has to be removed quickly to avoid the ship becoming top-heavy. Conditions in U-boats were, if anything, worse the boats having to submerge in warmer water to rid the superstructure of ice. Crewmen on watch were exposed to the elements, oil lost its viscosity, nuts froze and sheared off. Heaters in the hull wee too demanding of current and could not be run continuously.

Prelude

Kriegsmarine

In 1941, British Commando raids on the Lofoten Islands (Operation Claymore and Operation Anklet) led Adolf Hitler to order U-boats to be transferred from the Battle of the Atlantic to Norway and on 24 January 1942, eight U-boats were ordered to the area of Iceland–Faroes–Scotland. Two U-boats were based in Norway in July 1941, four in September, five in December and four in January 1942. By mid-February twenty U-boats were anticipated in the region, with six based in Norway, two in Narvik or Tromsø, two at Trondheim and two at Bergen. Hitler contemplated establishing a unified command but chose against it. The German battleship Tirpitz arrived at Trondheim on 16 January, the first ship of a general move of surface ships to Norway. British convoys to Russia had received little attention since they averaged only eight ships each and the long Arctic winter nights negated even the limited  effort that was available.

5

The Air Fleet  had 180 aircraft, sixty of which were reserved for operations on the Karelian Front against the Red Army.

Sixty aircraft were far from adequate in such a climate and terrain where "there is no favourable season for operations". The emphasis of air operations changed from army support to anti-shipping operations as Allied Arctic convoys became more frequent. Hubert Schmundt, the Admrial Nordmeer noted gloomily on 22 December 1941 that the number long-range reconnaissance aircraft was exiguous and from 1 to 15 December only two Ju 88 sorties had been possible. After the Lofoten Raids, Schmundt wanted  to transfer aircraft to northern Norway but its commander,  Hans-Jürgen Stumpff, was reluctant to deplete the defences of western Norway. Despite this some air units were transferred, a catapult ship, was sent to northern Norway and Heinkel He 115 floatplane torpedo-bombers, of  1./406 was transferred to Sola. By the end of 1941, III Gruppe, KG 30 had been transferred to Norway and in the new year, another  of Focke-Wulf Fw 200 Kondors from Kampfgeschwader 40 (KG 40) had arrived.  Was also expected to receive a  comprising three  of Heinkel He 111 torpedo-bombers.

Air-sea rescue

Co-operation was as important in rescues as it was in anti-shipping operations if people were to be saved before they succumbed to the climate and severe weather. The sea rescue aircraft comprised Heinkel He 59 floatplanes, Dornier Do 18 and Dornier Do 24 seaplanes. (OKL, the high command of the Luftwaffe) was not able to increase the number of search and rescue aircraft in Norway, due to a general shortage of aircraft and crews, despite Stumpff pointing out that coming down in such cold waters required extremely swift recovery and that his crews "must be given a chance of rescue" or morale could not be maintained.

Arctic convoys

The first convoy was due at Murmansk around 12 October and the next convoy was to depart Iceland on 22 October. A motley of British, Allied and neutral shipping loaded with military stores and raw materials for the Soviet war effort would be assembled at Hvalfjörður (Hvalfiord) in Iceland, convenient for ships from both sides of the Atlantic. By late 1941, the convoy system used in the Atlantic had been established on the Arctic run; a convoy commodore ensured that the ships' masters and signals officers attended a briefing to make arrangements for the management of the convoy, which sailed in a formation of long rows of short columns. The commodore was usually a retired naval officer or a Royal Naval Reserveist and would be aboard one of the merchant ships (identified by a white pendant with a blue cross). The commodore was assisted by a Naval signals party of four men, who used lamps, semaphore flags and telescopes to pass signals in code.

In large convoys, the commodore was assisted by vice- and rear-commodores with whom he directed the speed, course and zig-zagging of the merchant ships and liaised with the escort commander. By the end of 1941, 187 Matilda II and 249 Valentine tanks had been delivered, comprising 25 per cent of the medium-heavy tanks in the Red Army and 30 to 40 per cent of the medium-heavy tanks defending Moscow. In December 1941, 16 per cent of the fighters defending Moscow were Hawker Hurricanes and Curtiss Tomahawks from Britain; by 1 January 1942, 96 Hurricane fighters were flying in the Soviet Air Forces (VVS). The British supplied radar apparatuses, machine tools, ASDIC and other commodities. During the summer months, convoys went as far north as 75 N latitude then south into the Barents Sea and to the ports of Murmansk in the Kola Inlet and Archangel in the White Sea. In winter, due to the polar ice expanding southwards, the convoy route ran closer to Norway. The voyage was between  each way, taking at least three weeks for a round trip.

Convoy PQ 8

PQ 8 consisted of eight merchant ships; the British tankers British Pride and British Workman and the British merchant ships Dartford, Southgate and Harmatris (ship of the convoy commodore, R. W. Brundle), the Soviet Starii Bolshevik Soviet, Larranga the first US ship on the Arctic run and El Almirante a US ship of Panamanian registry; the convoy sailed from Loch Ewe in Wester Ross, Scotland, large enough to accommodate forty ships. The convoy sailed for Hvalfjörður (Hvalfiord) in Iceland on 28 December 1941. Convoys had a standard formation of short columns, number 1 to the left in the direction of travel.
 
Ships in column sailed at intervals of  until 1943, when the interval was increased to  then  to cater for inexperienced captains reluctant to keep so close.

Voyage

8–16 January
PQ 8 sailed from Hvalfjörður on 8 January 1942 and was joined on the night of 10/11 January in fine weather by the ocean escort, which had sailed from Scapa flow and re-fuelled at Seidisfiord on 9 January. On 12 January the convoy reached  and had to turn south to avoid ice; the weather remained calm with exceptional visibility, with a short period of twilight around noon. Trinidad made several departures from the convoy for training.

17 January

In the continuous darkness of the polar night, German reconnaissance aircraft and U-boats failed to find PQ 8.

At 7:45 p.m., U-454 found PQ 8 and fired a torpedo at the merchant ship Harmatris, which exploded in No. 1 hold on the starboard side. Brundle was off the bridge and the First Mate, George Masterman, promptly ordered the ship stopped, to prevent its forward motion from driving the ship under water. The crew was ordered to boat stations; luckily the torpedo warheads in No. 1 hold had fallen through the hole in the hull without detonating. From Trinidad it looked as if Harmatris had hit a mine but Matabele reported hearing a torpedo on its hydrophones.

The destroyers conducted an abortive anti-submarine sweep and Speedwell dropped back to stand near the ship. As the rest of the convoy sailed past in line, the vice-commodore on Larranga took over the convoy. An hour later the ship shook and Brundle thought it was a mine explosion but U-454 had manoeuvred round and hit Harmatris on the port side with a torpedo that failed to explode. Speedwell came alongside and took off the crew. During tthe night, as Harmatris settled at the bow and its propeller rose out of the sea, Brundle thought that Harmatiris could be towed and having persuaded Lieutenant-Commander Youngs, the captain of Speedwell, to attempt a tow, asked for volunteers; all of the crew offered to re-board the ship and were promptly transferred. Eventually a cable was passed to Harmatris but the towing sweeps soon snapped. At  Trinidad sent Matabele back to Harmatris as Sharpshooter had arrived from Kola at 

U-454 had sailed ahead of the ships and saw the tanker British Pride illuminated by the lighthouse at Cape Teriberskiy and fired a salvo of torpedoes. The salvo missed the tanker and one hit Matabele which exploded. Only two men, Ordinary Seamen William Burras and Ernest Higgins survived, the crew being killed in the torpedo explosion, the detonation of its depth charges or of hypothermia in the water.

18–19 January
On Harmatris the windlass had been damaged in the explosion and was immoveable; the anchor cable would have to be severed by hand. Youngs, on Speedwell, suggested that the crew of Harmatris should return and the crew spent the night on Speedwell, returning at  The crew found that the steam pipes had frozen; the steam had been left on, emptying the boilers and work on splitting the anchor cable had to resume by hand. Eventually the cable parted and cables were passed to Harmatris. At  Speedwell began to tow Harmatris. The Luftwaffe force had increased to 230 aircraft, based at airfields in northern Norway and at Petsamo in Finland.

The Heinkel strafed Harmatris at low altitude but was hit and driven off trailing smoke, by the anti-aircraft fire of the minesweepers and the eight Defensively equipped merchant ship (DEMS) gunners on Harmatris. Brundle tried to fire his Parachute and Cable rockets but they had frozen. A Junkers Ju 88 attacked about an hour later, straddled the ship with bombs which caused no damage and turned away, also trailing smoke, leaving bullet holes in the superstructure. (At Murmansk, Youngs said that the Heinkel had crashed and that the Russians had credited the two ships with the victory.) At  a steam pipe on Speedwell burst, severely injuring three men and Youngs called for a Soviet tug, which arrived quickly, taking over the tow as Speedwell raced for port to get the injured into hospital.

20 January
The German navy had planned to attack the convoy with the battleship Tirpitz but lack of fuel and insufficient destroyer escorts, due to them being diverted in support of the Channel Dash, forced a cancellation of the attack. The crew surveyed the ship and found that iron locking bars had been scattered about the deck and wooden hatched and tarpaulins were trapped in the rigging. Much of the interior was waterlogged, number 1 hold being almost full of water and the forward bulkhead had been broken along with the forepeak tank and the fore and aft bulkhead.

Aftermath

Analysis
While PQ 8 had sailed to Murmansk, QP 5 comprising Arcos, Dekabrist, Eulima and San Ambrosio had departed for Iceland on 13 January, escorted by the cruiser  and the destroyers  and  arriving safely on 24 January. Despite the loss of Matabele, PQ 8 had been fortunate that the German intention to sortie with Tirpitz had been cancelled due to its destroyer escorts being diverted south for the Channel Dash. The regular sailings to Murmansk, the failure of the German Army to capture the port six months after the start of Operation Barbarossa made the establishment of a U-boat force in Norway permanent and become a significant part of the anti-shipping effort.

Subsequent operations
The next convoy, the combined PQ 9 and PQ 10 (ten ships) and PQ 11 (13 ships) slipped past the German defences unscathed but the increasing hours of daylight made further convoys more vulnerable, when it would be another eight to twelve weeks before the pack ice receded. Tovey thought that it was wrong for U-boats to be able to lie in wait off the Kola Inlet. In Tovey's view the Russians should be able to make these waters too dangerous for U-boats and provide fighter cover to convoys as they approached their destination.

Harmatris
Harmatris had reached Murmansk but the crew found that it was not really equipped to handle the number of ships or the quantity of cargo to be unloaded. The two tankers passed highly volatile aviation spirit straight into railway tankers on the jetty, risky in itself and worse during the frequent Luftwaffe air raids on the port. (After Stalingrad Murmansk was the most bombed city of the Soviet Union). Discharge facilities were lacking, despite the development of the port since the First World War. Work began as soon as Harmatris berthed to get the ice out of the steam pipes, which took three days. With steam up, the cargo could be unloaded, which took until 4 February, most of the cargo being undamaged. On 5 February the ship was ordered to quay 6 to await dry-docking. The ship had a severe list to starboard and there was little steam to get the ice and snow off the deck as only sufficient steam pipes to unload had been cleared. To make matters worse, a fire began in the stoke-hold ashes, which heated the bulkhead of the cadets' room to red hot and caused their wardrobe to burn along with the cadets' clothes, two hours' work being needed to put out the fire. Harmatris went into dry-dock on 10 February, down  at the head and up  at the stern.

There was a hole  on the starboard bow, the No. 1 ballast tank had been destroyed and the bulkheads were damaged. The engine-room needed repairs but it was exceedingly difficult to find spare parts or obtain labour because of the shortage. The Captain sent groups of crewmembers to cadge spares from other ships but the shortages and the intense cold stopped work, then Brundle was told that Harmatris was being evicted from the dry dock to make room for a destroyer. No help was forthcoming from the Russian authorities and the engineers in the crew offered to continue the repair work provided the employer paid overtime. Since the U-boat attack, No. 2 hold had been taking on water which would add to the ship's list; Brundle spent much time telephoning British and Russian agencies to find an electric pump and had to be talked out of writing to Stalin in despair. The shipowners in Britain were informed who promised help and some Russian labour was provided in the form of 16–18-year old girls.

Murmansk received about three raids a day from the Luftwaffe, whose bases were five minutes' flying time away. New Westminster City was sunk on the night of 3/4 April and Empire Starlight nearby was bombed and set on fire, its cargo being unloaded between air raids and between firefighting but the ship was sunk on 16 June. On 14 April SS Lancaster Castle was sunk. many of the ships sunk were from convoy PQ 13, SS Tobruk, Deer Lodge from PQ 15 and Alcoa Cadet was sunk by an internal explosion. Steel Worker was blown up on a mine. The crew of Harmatris decided to work at night and sleep by day off the ship. While docked at Murmansk the dock was attacked thirty times, Harmatris shuddering and being rained with  bomb splinters.

PQ 8

Merchant ships

Escorts

Notes

Footnotes

References

Further reading

External links
  PQ 8 at Convoyweb

PQ 08
C